The 2010 Open GDF Suez was a women's professional tennis tournament played on indoor hard courts. It was the 18th edition of the Open GDF Suez (formerly known as the Open Gaz de France) and was a Premier tournament on the 2010 WTA Tour. It took place at Stade Pierre de Coubertin in Paris, France from February 8 through February 14, 2010.

The top two seeds were Elena Dementieva, the 2008 Olympic gold medalist in singles and a 2009 Wimbledon semifinalist and Flavia Pennetta. Also participating in the tournament were Yanina Wickmayer, home favourite Aravane Rezaï, Shahar Pe'er, and Alizé Cornet. Serena Williams, the 2010 Australian Open singles champion withdrew before the main draw was released.

Entrants

Seeds

1 Rankings as of February 1, 2010.

Other entrants
The following players received wildcards into the main draw:
 Julie Coin
 Petra Martić
 Flavia Pennetta

The following players received entry from the qualifying draw:
 Vesna Manasieva
 Ioana Raluca Olaru
 Evgeniya Rodina
 Karolina Šprem

Finals

Singles

 Elena Dementieva defeated  Lucie Šafářová, 6–7(5–7), 6–1, 6–4
It was Dementieva's second title of the year and sixteenth of her career. It was also Dementieva's last career title after her retirement at the end of the year.

Doubles

 Iveta Benešová /  Barbora Záhlavová-Strýcová defeated  Cara Black /  Liezel Huber, walkover

External links
Official website

Open GDF Suez
Open GDF Suez
Open GDF Suez
2010 in Paris
2010 in French tennis